Nueve (Spanish for 'nine') may refer to:
Nueve (Spanish TV channel), short-lived channel from 2013–2014
Nueve (Mexican TV network), also styled as Nu9ve, previously known as Galavisión and Gala TV
Channel 9 (Argentina), also known as "El Nueve"
La Nueve, 9th Company of the Régiment de marche du Tchad, who participated in the Liberation of France in World War II

See also
 Nueve de Julio (disambiguation)